Paoloni is an Italian surname. Notable people with the surname include:

 Marco Paoloni (born 1984), Italian footballer
 Paolo Paoloni (1929–2019), Italian actor
  (born 1985), Italian swimmer

Italian-language surnames
Patronymic surnames
Surnames from given names